Villesèquelande is a commune near Carcassonne in the Aude department in southern France. It is noted for the ancient field elm, the Ormeau Sully, allegedly planted by Maximilien de Béthune, Duke of Sully in the early 17th century in front of the church in the village centre.

Population

See also
Communes of the Aude department

References

Communes of Aude